Coelenterata is a term encompassing the animal phyla Cnidaria (coral animals, true jellies, sea anemones, sea pens, and their relatives) and Ctenophora (comb jellies). The name comes , referring to the hollow body cavity common to these two phyla. They have very simple tissue organization, with only two layers of cells (ectoderm and endoderm), and radial symmetry. Some examples are corals, which are typically colonial, and hydrae, jellyfish, and sea anemones, which are solitary. Coelenterata lack a specialized circulatory system relying instead on diffusion across the tissue layers.

Characteristics
All coelenterates are aquatic, mostly marine, animals. The body form is radially symmetrical, diploblastic and does not have a coelom. These tentacles are surrounded by a spacious cavity called the gastrovascular cavity, or coelenteron. Digestion is both intracellular and extracellular. Respiration and excretion are accomplished by simple diffusion. A network of nerves is spread throughout the body. Many Cnidaria exhibit polymorphism, wherein different types of individuals are present in a colony for different functions. These individuals are called zooids. These animals generally reproduce asexually by budding, though sexual reproduction does occur in some groups.

History of classification
The scientific validity of the term coelenterate is currently rejected, as the Cnidaria and Ctenophora have less in common than previously assumed. Coelentera may only be monophyletic if both Placozoa and Bilateria are included. In particular, the phylogenetic position of Ctenophora is controversial; it was first considered a sub-group of coelenterata but Hyman regarded it as a separate phylum. Most researchers think that Coelenterata is not monophyletic, and therefore any group containing Cnidaria and Ctenophora but excluding other phyla would be paraphyletic. 

Previously, some genomic studies have found support for monophyletic coelenterates.  Despite this uncertainty, the term coelenterate is still used in informal settings to refer to the Cnidaria and Ctenophora.

Complicating the issue is the 1997 work of Lynn Margulis (revising an earlier model by Thomas Cavalier-Smith) that placed the Cnidaria and Ctenophora alone in the branch Radiata within Eumetazoa. (The latter refers to all the animals except the sponges, Trichoplax, and the still poorly understood Mesozoa). Neither grouping is accepted universally, however, both are commonly encountered in taxonomic literature.

References

Obsolete animal taxa
Cnidarian taxonomy